Primosh Perera (born 17 May 1989) is a Sri Lankan first-class cricketer who plays for Bloomfield Cricket and Athletic Club. In March 2018, he was named in Colombo's squad for the 2017–18 Super Four Provincial Tournament.

References

External links
 

1989 births
Living people
Sri Lankan cricketers
Bloomfield Cricket and Athletic Club cricketers
Cricketers from Colombo
Galle Guardians cricketers
Nuwara Eliya District cricketers